James Tenney (August 10, 1934 – August 24, 2006) was an American composer and music theorist. He made significant early musical contributions to plunderphonics, sound synthesis, algorithmic composition, process music, spectral music, microtonal music, and tuning systems including extended just intonation. His theoretical writings variously concern musical form, texture, timbre, consonance and dissonance, and harmonic perception.

Biography

James Tenney was born in Silver City, New Mexico, and grew up in Arizona and Colorado. He attended the University of Denver, the Juilliard School of Music, Bennington College (B.A., 1958) and the University of Illinois (M.A., 1961). He studied piano with Eduard Steuermann and composition with Chou Wen-chung, Lionel Nowak, Paul Boepple, Henry Brant, Carl Ruggles, Kenneth Gaburo, John Cage, Harry Partch, and Edgard Varèse. He also studied acoustics, information theory and tape music composition under Lejaren Hiller. In 1961, Tenney completed an influential master's thesis entitled Meta (+) Hodos that made one of the earliest applications, if not the earliest application, of gestalt theory and cognitive science to music. His later writings include "Temporal gestalt perception in music" in the Journal of Music Theory, the chapter "John Cage and the Theory of Harmony" in Writings about John Cage, and the book A History of Consonance and Dissonance, among others.

Tenney's earliest works show the influence of Webern, Ruggles and Varèse, while a gradual assimilation of the ideas of John Cage influenced the development of his music in the 1960s. In 1961 he composed the early plunderphonic composition Collage No.1 (Blue Suede) (for tape) by sampling and manipulating a recording of Elvis Presley. His music from 1961 to 1964 was largely computer music completed at Bell Labs in New Jersey with Max Mathews. As such it constitutes one of the earliest significant bodies of algorithmically composed and computer synthesized music. Examples include Analog #1 (Noise Study) (1961) for tape using computer synthesized noise, and Phases (1963).

Tenney lived in or near New York City throughout the 1960s, where he was actively involved with Fluxus, the Judson Dance Theater, and the ensemble Tone Roads, which he co-founded with Malcolm Goldstein and Philip Corner. He was exceptionally dedicated to the music of American composer Charles Ives, many of whose compositions he conducted; his interpretation of Ives' Concord Sonata for piano was much praised.

Tenney collaborated closely as both musician and actor with his then-partner, the artist Carolee Schneemann (who he met in New York in 1955) until their separation in 1968. With Schneemann he co-starred in Fuses, a 1965 silent film of collaged and painted sequences of lovemaking. Tenney created the sound collages for Schneemann's Viet Flakes, 1965, and Snows, 1970, and performed in the New York City production of Meat Joy, 1964, Schneemann’s orgiastic celebration of the expressive body.

In 1967 Tenney gave an influential FORTRAN workshop for a group of composers and Fluxus artists that included Steve Reich, Nam June Paik, Dick Higgins, Jackson Mac Low, Joseph Byrd, Phil Corner, Alison Knowles and Max Neuhaus. Tenney was one of four performers of Steve Reich's Pendulum Music (1967) on May 27, 1969, at the Whitney Museum of American Art, alongside Michael Snow, Richard Serra and Bruce Nauman. Tenney also performed with Harry Partch (in a production of Partch's The Bewitched in 1959), John Cage (in the mid-1960s), Steve Reich, and Philip Glass (the latter two in the late 1960s).

All of Tenney's compositions after 1970 are instrumental music (occasionally with tape-delay), and most since 1972 reflect an interest in harmonic perception and unconventional tuning systems. Significant works include Clang (1972) for orchestra, Quintext (1972) for string quintet, Spectral CANON for CONLON Nancarrow (1974) for player piano, Glissade (1982) for viola, cello, double bass and tape delay system, Bridge (1982–84) for two pianos eight hands in a microtonal tuning system, Changes (1985) for six harps tuned a sixth of a semitone apart, Critical Band (1988) for variable instrumentation and In a Large Open Space (1994) for variable instrumentation. His pieces are often tributes to other composers or colleagues and subtitled as such.

Tenney taught at the Polytechnic Institute of Brooklyn, Yale University, the California Institute of the Arts, the University of California, and York University in Toronto. His students include John Luther Adams, John Bischoff, Michael Byron, Allison Cameron, Raven Chacon, Eric de Visscher, Miguel Frasconi, Peter Garland, Douglas Kahn, Carson Kievman, Ingram Marshall, Andra McCartney, Larry Polansky, Carl Stone, Charlemagne Palestine, Marc Sabat, Chiyoko Slavnics, Catherine Lamb, Michael Winter, and Daniel Corral.

Tenney died on 24 August 2006 of lung cancer in Santa Clarita, California.

Selected Recordings

As sole composer
The Music Of James Tenney: Selected Works 1963–1984 (1984, Musicworks)
Selected Works 1961–1969 (1992, Frog Peak Music)
Bridge and Flocking (1996, hat ART)
The Solo Works for Percussion (1998, Matthias Kaul, hat ART)
Music for Violin and Piano (1999, hat ART)
Forms 1–4: In Memoriam Edgar Varèse, John Cage, Stefan Wolpe, Morton Feldman (2002, Ensemble Musikfabrik, hat ART)
Pika-Don (2004, hat ART)
Postal Pieces (2004, The Barton Workshop, New World Records)
Melody, Ergodicity And Indeterminacy (2007, The Barton Workshop, Mode Records)
Arbor Vitæ: Quatuors + Quintettes (2008, Quatuor Bozzini)
Spectrum Pieces (2009, The Barton Workshop, New World Records)
Old School: James Tenney (2010, Zeitkratzer)
Having Never Written a Note for Percussion (2015, Rrose, Further Records)
Bass Works (2016, Dario Calderone, hat ART)
Harmonium (2018, Scordatura Ensemble, New World Records)

Individual works
Saxony
 David Mott, Composers Recordings, Inc. 1985
 Henrik Frisk, Inventions of Solitude, Hornblower Recordings 1995
 Ulrich Krieger, Walls of Sound, OODiscs 1996
 Ryan Muncy, ism, Tundra/New Focus 2016
Ergodos I For John Cage
 James Tenney, A Chance Operation: The John Cage Tribute, Koch International Classics) 1993
Koan: Having Never Written a Note for Percussion
 Sonic Youth, Goodbye 20th Century, SYR 1999
 William Winant, Five American Percussion Pieces, Poon Village 2013

References

Sources

Further reading
 Garland, Peter (ed.). 1984. Soundings Vol. 13: The Music of James Tenney. Santa Fe, New Mexico: Soundings Press.
 Hasegawa, Robert (ed.). 2008. "The Music of James Tenney". Contemporary Music Review 27, no. 1 (February)]. Routledge (subscription access).
 Polansky, Larry, and David Rosenboom (eds.). 1987. "A Tribute to James Tenney". Perspectives of New Music 25, nos. 1 & 2 (Fall–Winter & Spring–Summer): 434–591.
 Smigel, Eric. 2012. "Metaphors on Vision: James Tenney and Stan Brakhage, 1951–1964". American Music 30, no. 1 (Spring|: 61–100.
 Smigel, Eric. 2017. "'To Behold with Wonder': Theory, Theater, and the Collaboration of James Tenney and Carolee Schneemann". Journal of the Society for American Music 11, no. 1:1–24.
 Tenney, James. 1988. A History of 'Consonance' and 'Dissonance'. New York: Excelsior Music Publishing Co. .
 Wannamaker, Robert. 2021. The Music of James Tenney, Volume 1: Contexts and Paradigms. University of Illinois Press.
 Wannamaker, Robert. 2021. The Music of James Tenney, Volume 2: A Handbook to the Pieces. University of Illinois Press.
 Zimmerman, Walter, Desert Plants – Conversations with 23 American Musicians, Berlin: Beginner Press in cooperation with Mode Records, 2020 (originally published in 1976 by A.R.C., Vancouver). The 2020 edition includes a CD featuring the original interview recordings with Larry Austin, Robert Ashley, Jim Burton, John Cage, Philip Corner, Morton Feldman, Philip Glass, Joan La Barbara, Garrett List, Alvin Lucier, John McGuire, Charles Morrow, J. B. Floyd (on Conlon Nancarrow), Pauline Oliveros, Charlemagne Palestine, Ben Johnston (on Harry Partch), Steve Reich, David Rosenboom, Frederic Rzewski, Richard Teitelbaum, James Tenney, Christian Wolff, and La Monte Young.

External links
 James Tenney at plainsound.org including a complete list of works and a selection of Tenney's writings.
 The Early Works of James Tenney (book by Larry Polansky)
 Performance film Having Never inspired by the Tenney composition Having Never Written a Note for Percussion, a "Postcard Piece" with Danny Holt performing. Directed by Raffaello Mazza.

Listening
 Extensive YouTube channel dedicated to the music of James Tenney
 UbuWeb Sound page for James Tenney 
 Spectral Variation No 1 recording of premiere at DNK Amsterdam by Ciarán Maher
 Just intonation version of Tenney's Chromatic Canon for Two Pianos, using the tuning system provided by Tenney

Groups who often perform Tenney's works:
Array Music
Quatuor Bozzini

Interviews
Interview with Tenney about his work in the 1960s by Douglas Kahn in 1999
 (includes video)
 Hermits of Re-Tuning (Show 115)  James Tenney interviewed on Kalvos & Damian New Music Bazaar, August 2, 1997  (click to listen)
James Tenney interviewed by American Mavericks (click to listen)
 Schneemann, Carolee with Robert Enright. 1998. "Notes on Fuseology: Carolee Schneemann Remembers James Tenney".  Border Crossings 132 (December 2014).

20th-century classical composers
American experimental musicians
American classical composers
20th-century American composers
Canadian classical composers
Canadian experimental musicians
20th-century Canadian composers
Computer music
Just intonation composers
Microtonal composers
Fluxus
Minimalist composers
Spectral music
American electronic musicians
American music theorists
Pupils of John Cage
Pupils of Carl Ruggles
Pupils of Chou Wen-chung
Pupils of Eduard Steuermann
Pupils of Edgard Varèse
Pupils of Harry Partch
Pupils of Henry Brant
Pupils of Kenneth Gaburo
Polytechnic Institute of New York University faculty
California Institute of the Arts faculty
Academic staff of York University
People from Silver City, New Mexico
Musicians from New Mexico
Musicians from Denver
Bennington College alumni
Experimental Music Studios alumni
University of Illinois Urbana-Champaign alumni
University of Illinois alumni
American male classical composers
Deaths from lung cancer in California
1934 births
2006 deaths
20th-century American musicologists
20th-century American male musicians